Stenobatyle is a genus of beetles in the family Cerambycidae, containing the following species:

 Stenobatyle eburata (Chevrolat, 1862)
 Stenobatyle gracilis Chemsak, 1980
 Stenobatyle inflaticollis (Linsley, 1935)
 Stenobatyle miniatocollis (Chevrolat, 1862)
 Stenobatyle prolixa (Bates, 1892)

References

Trachyderini
Cerambycidae genera